The 1985 Kansas State Wildcats football team represented Kansas State University in the 1985 NCAA Division I-A football season.  Eighth-year head coach Jim Dickey was forced to resign after opening the season with two consecutive losses including one to an NCAA Division I-AA team. Assistant athletic director Lee Moon took over as interim coach for the rest of the season. The Wildcats played their home games in KSU Stadium.  They finished with a record of 1–10 overall and a 1–6 in Big Eight Conference play.

Schedule

Game Summaries

#Oklahoma

#5 Nebraska

Kansas State managed to prevent any single Nebraska runner from exceeding 100 yards, and even though Nebraska only completed six passes, it made no difference as the Wildcats were held to just a 1st-quarter field goal while the Cornhuskers had little trouble putting up 41 points.  Nebraska PK Dale Klein set a Nebraska and personal record when he kicked a 50-yard field goal, his 12th of the season.

References

Kansas State
Kansas State Wildcats football seasons
Kansas State Wildcats football